Megachile marshalli is a species of bee in the family Megachilidae. It was described by Friese in 1904.

References

Marshalli
Insects described in 1904